Agonopterix irrorata is a moth of the family Depressariidae. It is found in France, Switzerland, Sicily, Croatia, Ukraine, Greece, Crete, Israel and Syria.

The wingspan is 16–20 mm.

References

External links
lepiforum.de

Moths described in 1870
Agonopterix
Moths of Europe
Moths of the Middle East